Commission v Italy (or Commission of the European Communities v Italian Republic) refers to several different cases heard by the European Court of Justice, which the European Commission brought against Italy for infringing European Union law. This includes breach of the Treaty on the Functioning of the European Union (TFEU), or a failure to implement European Union Directives:

In Commission v Italy (1968) Case 7/68, Italy was not allowed to tax the export of art treasures. This case was important because it helped define the meaning of the word "goods" under European Law.
In Commission v Italy (1969) Case 24/68, Italy was not allowed to charge a levy on exports, which was then used to fund the collection of trade statistics.
In Commission v Italy (1972) Case 39/72, Italy failed to enforce EU Dairy Regulations on time.
In Commission v Italy (1985) Case 184/85, Italy imposed a protective tax on bananas which were not imposed on any other domestically produced fruit.
In Commission v Italy (2003) C-14/00, Italy had wrongly limited the use of the word "chocolate" to products without vegetable fat.
In Commission v Italy (2009) C-110/05, Italy wrongly banned motorcycles and mopeds from pulling trailers, which affected imported goods because Italian manufacturers didn't make such goods.
In Commission v Italy (2011) C-565/08 Italy could not require lawyers to abide by maximum tariffs, unless the client agreed, because this discouraged lawyers from other Member States from moving to Italy.

See also
Commission v France (disambiguation)
Commission v Germany (disambiguation)
Commission v Ireland (disambiguation)
Commission v United Kingdom (disambiguation)

Court of Justice of the European Union case law